The Hunter 37.5 Legend is an American sailboat that was designed by the Hunter Design Group and first built in 1990.

Production
The design was built by Hunter Marine in the United States from 1990 to 1997, but it is now out of production.

Design
The Hunter 37.5 Legend is a recreational keelboat, built predominantly of fiberglass, with wood trim. It has a fractional sloop rig, a raked stem, a walk-through reverse transom with a swimming platform and ladder, an internally mounted spade-type rudder controlled by a wheel and a fixed fin keel. It displaces  and carries  of ballast.

The boat was designed using CAD software. Standard factory equipment supplied included 130% roller furling genoa, fully battened mainsail, self-tailing winches, fore and aft cabins, sleeping accommodation for seven people, built-in solar panel, knotmeter, depth sounder, marine VHF radio, a teak and holly cabin sole, compressed natural gas stove and oven, anchor, a fog bell, emergency tiller and life jackets.

The design has a PHRF racing average handicap of 111 with a high of 126 and low of 96.

See also
List of sailing boat types

Similar sailboats
Hunter 37
Hunter 37 Legend
Hunter 376

References

External links
Official brochure

Keelboats
1990s sailboat type designs
Sailing yachts
Sailboat type designs by Hunter Design Team
Sailboat types built by Hunter Marine